Yeghishe Tourian  (23 February 1860 – 27 April 1930) was Armenian Patriarch of Jerusalem serving Armenian Patriarchate of Jerusalem from 1921 to 1929. He took over the position after the patriarchate position remained vacant for 11 years (1910–1921).

Born in Constantinople in the district of Uskudar as Mihran Tourian,  he was the younger brother of Western Armenian poet and playwright Bedros Tourian. He was a staunch believer in education. In Constantinople, he published a series of textbooks for teaching of Armenian , with first volume in 1880 and second volume in 1883,  (1882),  (1885). In 1909 he published his poems, and regularly contributed to Armenological studies in various publication under the title .

He was the Armenian Patriarch of Constantinople from 1909–10. Then moved to Jerusalem where he was consecrated as Patriarch. He engaged in vast educational reform and in 1925, established a unified elementary school to accommodate the growing number of children in the community. He also modernized the curriculum of the Armenian Seminary and acquiring highly qualified instructors from the cadre of talented teachers and educators who had come to Jerusalem as refugees after the Armenian genocide. In 1929, the unified elementary school officially opened its doors. By consolidating disparate locations, including the St. Gayane Girls' School, this new elementary school became the primary Armenian co-educational institution in the Holy Land and was renamed "School of the Holy Translators" (in Armenian "Serpots Tarkmantchats Varjaran").

Starting 1927, he resumed the publication of Sion as the official organ of the Patriarchate of Jerusalem. His collections and writings were published in Jerusalem in a multi-volume series by "Matenashar Tourian" dedicated to his name. It also contained some of his poems under the title Srpazan Knar.

He was appointed honorary Knight Commander of the Order of the British Empire (KBE) in the British 1930 New Year Honours.

Patriarch Torkom Koushagian wrote a lengthy study about his legacy first in a series in Egyptian Armenian daily Arev and later in a separate publication in Jerusalem.

Yeghishe Tourian was succeeded by Patriarch Torkom Koushagian.

References

People from Üsküdar
Armenian Patriarchs of Jerusalem
19th-century writers from the Ottoman Empire
20th-century poets from the Ottoman Empire
Armenian-language writers
1860 births
1930 deaths
Armenian Patriarchs of Constantinople
Armenian Oriental Orthodox Christians
Armenians from the Ottoman Empire
20th-century Oriental Orthodox bishops
Honorary Knights Commander of the Order of the British Empire